Erirhinidae is a family of marsh weevils in the order Coleoptera. There are about 12 genera and at least 40 described species in Erirhinidae.

The family Erirhinidae is sometimes treated as a subfamily of Brachyceridae, Erirhininae.

Genera
These 12 genera belong to the family Erirhinidae.

 Brachybamus Germar, 1835 i c g b
 Cyrtobagous Hustache, 1929 i c g b
 Grypus Germar, 1817 i c g b
 Lissorhoptrus LeConte, 1876 i c g b (rice water weevils)
 Neochetina Hustache, 1926 i c g b (waterhyacinth weevils)
 Notaris Germar, 1817 i c g b
 Notiodes Schönherr, 1838 i c g b
 Onychylis LeConte, 1876 i c g b
 Procas Stephens, 1831 i c g b
 Ruffodytes Osella, 1973 g
 Stenopelmus Schönherr, 1835 i c g b
 Tanysphyrus Germar, 1817 i c g b

Data sources: i = ITIS, c = Catalogue of Life, g = GBIF, b = Bugguide.net

References

Further reading

 
 
 
 
 
 
 
 
 
 
 
 
 
 
 
 
 
 
 

Polyphaga
Polyphaga families